The Carling Tournament was a professional golf tournament played in the United Kingdom from 1960 to 1962.

History
The first event, in 1960, was called the Hammonds-Carling Jubilee Tournament and was held at Pannal Golf Club, Harrogate, Yorkshire. It was won by Dai Rees, who won the first prize of £550.

The 1961 event was called the Carling-Caledonian Tournament and was held at Longniddry Golf Club, East Lothian, Scotland. It was won by Christy O'Connor Snr, who took home the first prize of £1,000. The event was the last before the selection of the British 1961 Ryder Cup team.

In 1962 the event was called the Carling-Lancastrian Tournament and was held at Fairhaven Golf Club, Lytham St Annes, Lancashire. It was won by Kel Nagle, who won the first prize of £1,000.

An event was planned for 1963 but was cancelled when Carling announced the start of the Carling World Open from 1964.

Winners

References

Golf tournaments in the United Kingdom
Recurring sporting events established in 1960
Recurring sporting events disestablished in 1962
1960 establishments in England
1962 disestablishments in England